Lord Duncan was launched at Sunderland in 1798. She initially traded with Smyrna, where in late 1801 she suffered a lightning strike. In 1806 she started trading with San Domingo and was blown up there in 1807 in an explosion.

Career
Lord Duncan first appeared in Lloyd's Register (LR) in 1800.
	

Captain Joseph Thompson acquired a letter of marque on 18 March 1800.

On 16 November 1801, Lord Duncan, Thompson master, was at Smyrna when lightning struck her. She suffered considerable damage.

Captain Thompson acquired a letter of marque on 8 October 1806, but then Captain Archibald Heurtley acquired one on 29 October.Lloyd's List reported that on 7 December 1806 Lord Duncan, Hurtly, master, had put into Portsmouth leaky; she was making five feet of water in an hour. She was on her way from London to St Domingo.

FateLloyd's List reported in October 1807 that Lord Duncan'', of and for London, Huersley, master,  had been destroyed an explosion at Saint Domingo with the loss of her Chief Mate and seaman. She had 200 tons of coffee aboard.

Citations

1798 ships
Ships built on the River Wear
Maritime incidents in 1801
Maritime incidents in 1807